Clifton Baptist Church Complex is a historic church and school complex which is virtually the only remnant of the historic African-American hamlet of Clifton, Kentucky, a community formed after the American Civil War.  The church and the school were built in 1886.  Other contributing resources in the complex are a dining hall, a privy, a cemetery, a plank fence and a rock fence.  The complex was added to the National Register of Historic Places in 1998.

References

See also
National Register of Historic Places listings in Kentucky

Baptist churches in Kentucky
Churches on the National Register of Historic Places in Kentucky
Churches in Boyle County, Kentucky
National Register of Historic Places in Boyle County, Kentucky
1886 establishments in Kentucky
Baptist schools in the United States
Schools in Boyle County, Kentucky
School buildings on the National Register of Historic Places in Kentucky
African-American history of Kentucky